The Cheshire Football Association, also simply known as Cheshire FA, is the governing body of football in the county of Cheshire, England. They are responsible for the governance and development of football at all levels in the county.

About

The Cheshire Football Association is the not-for-profit governing body for all football in Cheshire and is responsible for the governance, organisation, education and development of grassroots football.

Cheshire FA works in conjunction with the National Football Association and is an enterprising and dynamic SME based in the heart of the county.

They have approximately 3500 teams playing various formats of affiliated football with over 60,000 weekly participants. The game is supported by over 1,000 referees and upwards of 10,000 volunteers running the game.

Cheshire FA works towards a strategic framework that looks to inwardly invest into key aspects of the game. Over £24 million has been invested into facilities supporting the local football infrastructure and over £4 million into revenue projects.

In 2000 the association became incorporated and seven Directors were appointed with responsibility for business and financial matters, leaving the traditionally elected Council, through a number of Standing Committees, to retain full responsibility for all football-related activities.

On 30 October 2003, Cheshire FA Headquarters & Football Development Centre was opened by the Chairman of The Football Association. A year later Cheshire FA Celebrated its 125th Anniversary and were presented with an address from the FA to record its appreciation of the outstanding services to the game rendered by the officers and members.

Following on from the European Learning Difficulties European Championships in 2008 Cheshire FA was formally recognised by the UEFA grassroots programme for the legacy work that was undertaken for and beyond the championships.

Currently, Cheshire FA employees a professional team of 24 staff.

In May 2018 the association announced plans for a £70m development near Northwich, modelled on St George's Park National Football Centre. The facility would include two FIFA-standard pitches with a 1000-seat stadium, 3G pitches, six grass pitches, full medical facilities and a hotel/spa.

District Associations

Cheshire FA has a sub County structure of nine District Football Associations who play an integral part in governing and developing Football.

The nine District Associations are as follows:

Altrincham and District Association
Chester and District Association
Crewe and District Association

Macclesfield and District Association
Mid Cheshire District Association
Runcorn and District Association

Stalybridge and Hyde District Association
Stockport and District Association
Wirral District Association

Affiliated Member Clubs
Among the notable clubs that are (or have been) affiliated to Cheshire FA are:

1874 Northwich
Alsager Town
Altrincham
Barnton
Cammell Laird
Cheadle Town
Chester City (now defunct)
Chester FC

Congleton Town
Crewe Alexandra
Ellesmere Port Town
Heswall
Hyde United
Knutsford
Middlewich Town
Nantwich Town

New Brighton (now defunct)
Northwich Victoria
Runcorn Halton (now defunct)
Runcorn Linnets
Runcorn Town
Sandbach United
Stalybridge Celtic
Stockport County

Stockport Town
Witton Albion
Woodley Sports (now defunct)
Tranmere Rovers
Vauxhall Motors
Warrington Town
Winsford United

The Cheshire FA currently organises nine County Cup competitions. Holders are:

Source

List of Cheshire Senior Cup Winners

Sources

Directors and officials

Board of Directors
D. D. Edmunds (Chairman)
T. G. Harrop (Vice Chairman)
P. Cullen
D. W. Mansfield
M. J. Pomfret
P. Ferneyhough
S. Humphreys
C. Garlick
K. Rickett

External links

Cheshire FA's official website
@Cheshire_FA - Twitter Account
Cheshire FA's Facebook page

References

County football associations
Football in Cheshire
Sports organizations established in 1878